Star Porter was an American Thoroughbred race horse who was a noteworthy competitor in horse racing in the 1930s. He was from the stable of George McMitchell and a son of The Porter. He was owned by Major Ral Parr, a Philadelphia, Pennsylvania native, who also owned Paul Jones, the 1921 Kentucky Derby winner, and Ticket of Leave. The latter horse established a world record for two miles in 1914, which still stands.

Races 1933 - 1936
Star Porter triumphed over the filly Edelweiss at Maryland's Havre de Grace Racetrack, on April 28, 1933. He finished a length ahead in the Magnolia Purse, while being ridden by jockey Eddie Steffen. In the feature race, Star Porter ran from the outside post and led almost from start to finish.

In the six furlong Andros Handicap at Bowie Race Track he placed first in a field of sprinters on November 26, 1934. His time, 1:13 1/5, was fractions off the quickest time of the meeting. Tiring at the end, the field ran a very fast first quarter.

In April 1935 the thoroughbred weighed 118 pounds for the Bowie Inaugural Handicap.

Star Porter defeated Bootmaker as an 11 to 5 shot at Aqueduct Racetrack to win the Ben Holladay Handicap on September 14, 1936. He ran the mile in 1:37 3/5, the best time of the meeting.

A sprinter, Star Porter was best suited to racing events like the Sparrows Point, a six furlong race run at Pimlico Race Course on May 4, 1936. He bested a longshot, Irish Ted, in this claiming handicap feature.

References
 Star Porter's pedigree and partial racing stats

1930 racehorse births
Thoroughbred family 12-b
Racehorses trained in the United States
Racehorses bred in Virginia